Harry Libanotis (born 29 September 1977) is a Seychellois football player. He was a defender on the Seychelles national football team.

References

External links

1977 births
Living people
Seychellois footballers
Seychelles international footballers
Association football defenders
Place of birth missing (living people)